Lessona is a comune (municipality) in the Province of Biella in the Italian region Piedmont.

Lessona may also refer to:
 Lessona (wine), an Italian wine
 Lessona (surname)